Reg Hammond (15 June 1920 – 19 September 1981) was  a former Australian rules footballer who played with Fitzroy in the Victorian Football League (VFL).

Notes

External links 		
		
		
				
		
		
1920 births		
1981 deaths		
Australian rules footballers from Victoria (Australia)		
Fitzroy Football Club players